Abdul Rashid Obuobi (born 18 December 1994) is a Ghanaian footballer. He is capable of playing as a winger, or full-back on the left flank.

Club career

Sloga Kraljevo
Obuobi played with Accra New Town in his hometown Accra, before he joined Sloga Kraljevo in 2013-2014 winter break off-season. He arrived together with Nigerian Rueben Ogbonna Okoro and they were two Africans in Sloga footballers after a long time. Previously Victor Agbo played for Sloga in 2008. He has earned the right to play for Sloga in 3rd spring fixture and he scored a goal on that home win versus BSK Borča with result 4:1. He played total 12 matches until the end of competition, with 11 starts. He made good games on the beginning and continued with them, making chances in attack for him and other players. Teammates and supporters called him "Buba" (bug) in the meantime, shortly of his surname.

Donji Srem
He signed with Donji Srem in June 2014,. He made his professional debut for Donji Srem and his Serbian SuperLiga debut on away lost 3:0 against Partizan on 24 August 2014 when he replaced Aleksandar Stanisavljević on 58 minute of match. Obuobi also made 5 Serbian First League appearances during the first half of 2015–16 season.

Career statistics

Honours
Ventspils
Latvian Football Cup: 2016–17

References

External links
 Abdul Rashid Obuobi stats at utakmica.rs 
 
 

1994 births
Living people
Footballers from Accra
Association football midfielders
Ghanaian footballers
Ghanaian expatriate footballers
Ghanaian expatriate sportspeople in Serbia
Expatriate footballers in Serbia
FK Sloga Kraljevo players
FK Donji Srem players
FK Borac Čačak players
FK Voždovac players
Serbian First League players
Serbian SuperLiga players
Ghanaian expatriate sportspeople in Latvia
Expatriate footballers in Latvia
FK Ventspils players
Latvian Higher League players